The Koblenz cable car (German: Seilbahn Koblenz) is an aerial lift that was opened in 2010 in Koblenz, Germany for the Bundesgartenschau (a biennial exhibition) the following year. It connects the banks of the river Rhine and the hill plateau next to Ehrenbreitstein Fortress. The cable car system has an 890m length and elevates 112m.

The gondola system has an hourly capacity of 7600 people, the most for any such a ride in the world.  It operates usually between April and October of a given year. Its construction and operation is in control by an Austrian company specialized in such rides, the Doppelmayr Gruppe.

See also
Ehrenbreitstein Fortress
Federal Horticultural Show 2011
Cologne Cable Car, which was also built for a Bundesgartenschau in 1957.

References 

Koblenz
Cable cars in Germany
2010 establishments in Germany